Mou Min Kap Sin Fung, also known by its alternative title File Noir, is a 1989 Hong Kong action crime thriller television series produced by TVB and starring David Siu, Kitty Lai, Donnie Yen and Francis Ng. Originally released overseas in September 1988 and aired from 1 to 26 May 1989 on TVB Jade, the series reran on TVB's Network Vision channel from 25 January to 29 February 2016 as a part of the special, Our... Donnie Yen (我們的...甄子丹), that began running on 11 January 2016.

Plot
While investigating a tanker explosion case, news reporter Hau Man-wan (David Siu) suspects it as scheme for Au Chi-ho's (Kenneth Tsang) consortium to deceive insurance money. Man-wan uses his relationship with Au's daughter, Man-ching (Frances Lau), to get close to Au, hoping to find out the truth. Au is fiercely ambitious and in order for him to expand his influence, he resorts to ruses to annex the force of his opponents and uses Man-wan to gather criminal evidence to put his opponents in jail.

At this time, Man-wan's good friend, police inspector Tse Kwok-tung (Donnie Yen), whose girlfriend, Candy, was recently murdered, suspects the culprit behind this case to be Au's underling, Lee Long (Francis Ng). Kwok-tung decides to closely investigate this with his old partner, sergeant Lee Fan (Ng Man-tat). However, Kwok-tung was framed while investigating and was transferred to another department, with female inspector Hung Wai-ling (Kitty Lai) takes over his duties. Wai-ling is Man-wan's girlfriend who opposes her boyfriend to investigate Au, while also prevents Fan from helping Kwok-tung. As a result, Fan is highly dissatisfied with his new superior and often gets into conflicts with her, giving little development the investigation. Later, Wan-wan decides to put his life at risk and go undercover into Au's organization in order to find out the truth, hoping to assist Kwok-tung and Fan on the investigation.

Cast

David Siu as Hau Man-wan (侯萬雲)
Kitty Lai as Hung Wai-ling (洪惠玲)
Donnie Yen as Tse Kwok-tung (謝國棟)
Francis Ng as Lee Long (李朗)
Cecilia Yiu as Ruby
Flora Cheng as Hau Ying-ying (侯瑩瑩)
Pau Fong as Lung Sei (龍四)
Lai Koon-sing as Lok Kam (駱淦)
Frances Lau as Au Man-ching (歐曼菁)
Stephen Chow as Cheung Ka-shu (張家樹)
Cheung Yik-ming
Lau On-kei
Felix Lok as Keung Ning (姜寧)
Fong Wai-ming
Law Kwok-wai as Ho Sam (何森)
Wong Sze-yan as Tai-mung Sing (大懵成)
Lee Yeung-to as Siu-fai (小輝)
Hui Yat-wah as Chu (珠女)
Wong Wai-tak as Keung (阿強)
Wayne Lai as Ming (阿明)
Yip Seung-wah as Sin Chi-kuen (冼志權)
Ng Man-tat as Lee Fan (李凡)
Choi Wan
Yeung Chi-to
Sher Ng as Wan Ho-yan (雲可茵)
Wong Chung-chi
Leung Suk-yee
Mok Yee-lun
Mak Chi-wan as Mad Bill (喪彪)
Ailen Sit
Tsang Wai-suet
Ma Wai-ling
Ting Wing-ka
Ng Wah-san
Pau Wai-leung
Leung Ying-wai
So Han-sang
Kenneth Tsang as Au Koon-ho (歐冠豪)
Ng Pok-kwan
Raymond Tsang
Lee Kwok-ping
Ng Kai-ming as Sin Chi-mau (冼志謀)
Lau Siu-ming as Lee Chun-kwok (李鎮國)
Ling Hon
Yu Mo-lin
Lee Wong-sang
Cheung Chi-keung
Yvonne Lam as Sze Suet-fong (師雪芳)
Tsui Kwong-lam
Derek Kok
Tsui Po-lun
Yip Sai-kuen
Mui Lan
Keung Wai-nam
Ho Kwai-lam as Mr. Ohno (大野先生)
Yue Ming
Chow Tin-tak
Hon Chun
Wan Lai-yin
Leung Oi
Evergreen Mak as Billy (Billy仔)
Lam Ka-lai
Cutie Mui as Winnie
Cheung Suen-mei
Pui Wan
Ma Hing-sang
Yeun Chung-yee
Frankie Lam as John
Kong Ming-fai as Ken
Leung Kin-ping as Lawyer Chan (陳律師)
Tam Yat-ching
Andy Tai as Luk Hong-kai (陸鴻楷)
So Pui-san
Kong Ning
Tam Hing-chuen as Stephen
Yeung Yim-tong as Frog (田雞)
Yip Pik-wan
Chin Pak-kong
Yeung Kai-fong
Hui Sat-yin
Lam Kin-fai
Chung Chi-hung
Yue Chi-wai
Alan Chan
Cho Tak-kin
Wong Mei-wah
Chiu Hung
Chan Ka-pik
Suen Kwai-hing
Lai Pik-man
Brian Wong
Tin Chi-yee
To Siu-lut
Chun Cheuk-fan

See also
Donnie Yen filmography
List of TVB series (1989)

References

External links
Mo Min Kap Sin Fung at MyTV
Mo Min Kap Sin Fung at DonnieYen.asia

TVB dramas
1989 Hong Kong television series debuts
1989 Hong Kong television series endings
Hong Kong action television series
Hong Kong crime television series
Martial arts television series
Serial drama television series
1980s Hong Kong television series
Cantonese-language television shows
Television series about journalism